Jim Bernstein is an American screenwriter and producer. He is co-creator and executive producer of the Disney XD series Mighty Med. He is a graduate of the USC School of Cinematic Arts and has been nominated for three Emmy awards.  In 2021, he won an Emmy Award for Outstanding Writing Team for a Daytime Animated Program for Phineas and Ferb the Movie: Candace Against the Universe.

Writer 

Hamster & Gretel (2020) TV Series (writer)
Phineas and Ferb the Movie: Candace Against the Universe (2020) Movie (co-writer)—Emmy Award Winner
Milo Murphy's Law  (2016) TV Series (writer)
Mighty Med (2013) TV Series (co-creator/executive producer)
Phineas and Ferb (2007) TV Series (writer)—Emmy Nomination
Shane (2007) TV Pilot (co-creator)
American Dad! (2005) TV Series (co-executive producer)—Emmy Nomination
Quintuplets (2004) TV Series (supervising producer)
Andy Richter Controls the Universe TV Series (2002–2004) (producer)
Oliver Beene TV Series (2003) (supervising producer)
Family Guy TV Series (1999–2002) (story editor)
Off Centre TV Series (2001) (consultant)
The Trouble With Normal TV Series (2000) (story editor)
Big Wolf on Campus TV Series (1999–2000) (staff writer)
Homeboys in Outer Space TV Series (1996) (staff writer)

References

External links

Living people
Year of birth missing (living people)
USC School of Cinematic Arts alumni
American television writers
Place of birth missing (living people)
American male television writers